is a Japanese graphic designer born in Tokyo. He graduated in 1979 from Tokyo National University of Fine Arts and Music (currently Tokyo University of the Arts) in the Department of Design. He completed his master's degree in 1981. In 1984 founded Taku Satoh Design Office after working at Dentsu Inc. His work in graphic design includes "Pleats Please Issey Miyake" and the logos of the 21st Century Museum of Contemporary Art, Kanazawa and the National Museum of Nature and Science, Tokyo.

Along with Issey Miyake, Naoto Fukasawa and Noriko Kawakami, he is director of 21 21 Design Sight in Tokyo, where he curated their second Exhibition "Water" in 2007, and "Design Ah!" in 2013. In 2014 he directed together with anthropologist Shinichi Takemura the exhibition "Kome: The Art Of Rice".

In 2016 Satoh has directed the exhibition "Design Anatomy, a method for seeing the world through familiar objects" at 21 21 Design Sight.

References

External links 
Taku Satoh Design Office

Japanese graphic designers
1955 births
Living people